Heddatron is a 2006 play by Elizabeth Meriwether. The play is an adaptation of Henrik Ibsen's Hedda Gabbler. It premiered at the HERE Arts Centre in New York City as directed by Alex Timbers and starred Carolyn Baeumler as Jane.

Characters 
Humans:

 Jane Gordon
 Nugget Gordon, Jane's 10-year-old daughter and the play's narrator
 Rick Gordon, Jane's husband
 Cubby Gordon, Rick's brother
 Henrik Ibsen
 Mrs. Ibsen
 August Strindberg
 Else, a maid
 Strindberg's Monkey
 Film student
 Engineer

Robots:

 Hans, plays Eilert Lovborg
 Billy, plays George Tesman (Hedda's husband)
 Brack-Bot, plays Judge Brack
 Aunt Julie-Bot
 Berta-Bot

Plot 
In 2006 in Ypsilanti, Michigan, Nugget Gordon, a precocious ten-year-old girl, gives a presentation to her class about Henrik Ibsen. Her presentation is interspersed with scenes of Ibsen, his wife, their maid, and Ibsen's rival, August Strindberg. There are also scenes of Nugget's family as her father and uncle attempt to make a documentary. As the first act progresses, it becomes clear that Nugget's pregnant mother, Jane, has been kidnapped by robots and taken to the rainforest. In the second act of the play, the robots force Jane to play the role of Hedda Gabler in their performance of the play of the same name. Cubby and Rick attempt to rescue Jane from the robots and Jane tries to commit suicide by shooting herself in the head. In the third act, the family has returned to Michigan and must deal with the aftermath of Jane's suicide attempt. Nugget finishes her presentation on Ibsen.

Production history 
The play premiered in 2006, marking the centenary of Ibsen's death, with Les Freres Corbusier. It was directed by Alex Timbers at the HERE Arts Center. Carolyn Baeumler starred as Jane. The robots for the premiere were designed by Botmatrix's Cindy Jeffers and Meredith Finkelstein.

Salvage Vanguard Theater in Austin, Texas performed Heddatron in 2011. In 2012, Ion Theatre in San Diego performed Heddatron starring Monique Gaffney as Jane and directed by Claudio Raygoza. In 2017, the Boise State University Department of Theatre Arts performed Heddatron under the direction of Michael Baltzell.  In the spring of 2022, the Skidmore College Department of Theater staged "Heddatron" in the Janet Kinghorn Bernhard Theater, directed by Dennis Schebetta and starring Sophie Pettit as Jane.

References 

2006 plays
Adaptations of works by Henrik Ibsen
American plays
Plays set in Michigan
Metafictional plays
Plays about families
Plays about writers
Fiction about suicide